These are the results for the 97th edition of the Milan–San Remo cycling classic, raced on March 18, 2006. Filippo Pozzato, who was controlling a breakaway for teammate Tom Boonen, managed to steal the victory from the sprinters.  It was less than 5 minutes off the record pace set in the 1990 Milan–San Remo.

General Standings

18-03-2006: Milan–San Remo, 294 km.

External links
Race website

2006
March 2006 sports events in Europe
2006 UCI ProTour
2006 in Italian sport
2006 in road cycling